The Nokia 6.1, also known as the Nokia 6 (2018) and the second-generation Nokia 6, is a Nokia-branded mid-range smartphone running the Android operating system. It was launched on 25 February 2018 in China as the successor to the first-generation Nokia 6.

Specifications

Hardware
The second-generation Nokia 6 is powered by the Snapdragon 630 microprocessor, an upgrade from the Snapdragon 430 present in its predecessor. Depending on the version, it either comes with 32 GB storage and 3 GB of LPDDR4 RAM or 64 GB storage and 4 GB of RAM.

The display panel is the same 5.5" 1080p IPS LCD as the original, although the front bezels have been slimmed down and the capacitive navigation buttons and home button have been replaced with on-screen keys.

The camera setup is also the same combination of 16 MP rear and 8 MP selfie found in its predecessor, and retains the "Bothie" feature, which uses both cameras and splits the screen in half to capture an image or does picture in picture mode, showing the inwards camera in a small rectangle on top of the outwards camera, or vice versa.

One of the main changes is the replacement of the micro-USB port in favor of the reversible USB-C, as well as the shift of the fingerprint sensor to the rear of the device. It keeps the 3.5 mm headphone jack. The Nokia 6.1 also supports Nokia OZO audio.

Software
The phone was launched in China running Android 7.1.1 Nougat and was upgradable to Android 8.0 Oreo, Android 9 Pie followed by Android 10. All other versions, including the international one, which launched later, ship with Android 8.1 Oreo, upgradeable to Android 9 Pie since the end of October 2018 and Android 10 since 10 January 2020. It is part of the Android One program, which means the device gets 2 years of Android OS updates and 3 years of security updates and is therefore upgradeable up to Android 10.

Reception
The  Nokia 6.1 mostly received positive reviews. Holly Brockwell of TechRadar praised the phone’s software, design and screen while criticising the battery, camera and audio.

References

External links
 

6.1
Mobile phones introduced in 2018
Discontinued smartphones